Bibi Rajindar Kaur, also known as Rajindan, was a Sikh princess. In 1778, her first cousin Raja Amar Singh of Patiala was defeated by Hari Singh of Sialba. She led 3,000 soldiers to rescue him. She also defended the city of Patiala against Maratha attacks. Rajinder, Patiala princess known for her valorous qualities, was the granddaughter of Baba Ala Singh. The only child of her father, Bhumla Singh, who had died when she was barely four, she was brought up by her grandfather, and, in 1751, married to Chaudhari Tilok Chand, of Phagwara. Har husband died at a young age and the charge of the family estate, consisting of over two hundred villages, fell to her. When Baba Ala Singh was arrested in 1765 by Ahmad Shah Durrani for having fallen into arrears with the tribute and was being taken to Lahore, Rajindar Kaur went to her grandfather and offered to pay the money to secure his release.

References

Sources
"Bibi Princess Rajinder Kaur ji", URL accessed 08/31/06

1739 births
1791 deaths
Female Sikh warriors
History of Sikhism
Indian princesses
People from Patiala
Punjabi people
Women in 18th-century warfare
18th-century Indian women
18th-century Indian people